{{Automatic_taxobox 
| name = Anarchias
| image = TakamayuUBf.jpg
| image_caption = Anarchias seychellensis'
| taxon = Anarchias
| authority = Bloch, 1795
| subdivision_ranks = Species
| subdivision = See text.
}}Anarchias is a genus of moray eels in the family Muraenidae.

Species
 Anarchias allardicei D. S. Jordan & Starks, 1906 (Allardice's moray) (formerly Anarchias maldiviensis)Anarchias cantonensis (L. P. Schultz, 1943) (Canton Island moray)Anarchias euryurus (E. H. M. Lea, 1913)Anarchias exulatus Reece, D. G. Smith & Holm, 2010Anarchias galapagensis (Seale, 1940) (Minute moray)Anarchias leucurus (Snyder, 1904) (Snyder's moray)Anarchias longicaudis (W. K. H. Peters, 1877)Anarchias schultzi Reece, D. G. Smith & Holm, 2010Anarchias seychellensis J. L. B. Smith, 1962 (Seychelles moray)Anarchias similis (E. H. M. Lea, 1913) (Pygmy moray) (formerly Anarchias grassi and Anarchias yoshiae)Anarchias supremus'' McCosker & A. L. Stewart, 2006

References

 

 
Muraenidae